Leslie Michael Phillips (born 7 January 1963) is an English former football midfielder who scored 13 goals from 249 appearances in the Football League.

Phillips began his career at Birmingham City as an apprentice in 1979. He was capped by England at youth level, and made his first-team debut for Birmingham in a 2–2 draw at West Ham United in February 1982. In all he played 44 league games for Birmingham, scoring 3 goals, before he was transferred to Oxford United in March 1984. Phillips enjoyed a long spell at Oxford, remaining with the club until 1993, and he featured in to date the club's only major honour, the 1986 Football League Cup Final. His final league season was with Northampton Town during the 1993-94 season.

He moved into non-league football with Marlow, and finished his playing career at Banbury United, before returning to Oxford United as a scout in 2008.

References

1963 births
Living people
Footballers from Lambeth
English footballers
England youth international footballers
Association football midfielders
Birmingham City F.C. players
Oxford United F.C. players
Northampton Town F.C. players
Marlow F.C. players
Banbury United F.C. players
English Football League players
Oxford United F.C. non-playing staff